The 1920 United States presidential election in West Virginia took place on November 2, 1920, as part of the 1920 United States presidential election which was held throughout all contemporary 48 states. Voters chose eight representatives, or electors to the Electoral College, who voted for president and vice president. 

West Virginia voted for the Republican nominee, Ohio Senator Warren G. Harding, over the Democratic nominee, Ohio Governor James M. Cox. Harding ran with Massachusetts Governor Calvin Coolidge, while Cox ran with Assistant Secretary of the Navy Franklin D. Roosevelt of New York. 

Harding won the state by a margin of 12 percent, was the first ever Republican victor in Summers County, the first since Ulysses S. Grant in 1868 in Braxton County, and the last until Richard Nixon in 1972 in Braxton and Boone Counties.

Results

Results by county

References

West Virginia
1920
1920 West Virginia elections